Georgiy Tsybulnikov (born November 21, 1966) is a Russian sprint canoer who competed in the 1990s. He won a bronze medal in the K-4 1000 m event at the 1996 Summer Olympics in Atlanta, together with teammates Oleg Gorobiy, Sergey Verlin and Anatoli Tishchenko.

Tsybulnikov also won a bronze medal in the K-4 1000 m event at the 1998 ICF Canoe Sprint World Championships in Szeged.

References
DatabaseOlympics.com profile

1966 births
Canoeists at the 1996 Summer Olympics
Living people
Olympic canoeists of Russia
Olympic bronze medalists for Russia
Russian male canoeists
Olympic medalists in canoeing
ICF Canoe Sprint World Championships medalists in kayak
Medalists at the 1996 Summer Olympics